The Thengal Kachari people are an indigenous ethnic group of Assam, India. They are manily concentrated in the Jorhat, Golaghat, North Lakhimpur, Nagaon and Karbi Anglong districts.

Etymology 
There are different theories regarding the origin of the term Thengal. As per the census of India, 1891, the Thengal kacharis derive their name from an ancestor who is said to have ascended to heaven leg foremost. But according to Jogeswar Borah, earlier the Thengals used to wear a pantaloon called "Thenga" from which the name has been derived.

They are also called as 'Rupowal' from their traditional occupation as silver washers. However, some people in recent time don't prefer this term.

History 
Historical accounts on Thengals are very scarce.  According to Hiteswar Borbaruah, some Sonowals used to procure silver in the Dhansiri river and were called Thengals or Rupowal. But earlier they were known by the name "Rupiya thakur".

Culture 
Thengal kachari is a functional group that were silver washers by profession during the Ahom rule. They practice endogamy and reported to be inhabiting the eastern portion of the Brahmaputra valley. They are advanced Hindus than the Sonowal Kacharis, but indulge in forbidden food and drink. They do not worship or sacrifice to idols. Various animistic practices are still prevalent. And they engage a brahmin in marriage, but with the advent of Ekasarna Vaishnavism this practice has declined.

Clans 
Thengals have twenty one exogamous clans each of which was formed according to various occupations. They are 1. Hajowal, 2. Manikial, 3. Muktal or Mukutial, 4. Durrungial, 5. Dalangiyal, 6. Sakuriyal, 7. Haigiyal or Sargial, 8. Xukrial, 9. Hogral, 10. Biyagharal, 11. Kumral or Kumarial, 12. Dekral or Dhekiyal, 13. Nangal, 14 Lathiyal, 15. Neguriyal, 16. Dinkgiyal, 17. Dhuliyal, 18. Formal, 19. Ejmal, 20. Mekheliyal. Marriage within the same clan is strictly prohibited.

Language 
The language of Thengals is Assamese. However, there are some phonetic variations in their speech due to their Tibeto-burman background. According to Nanda Bora, the language of Thengal and Sonowal Kacharis is actually Assamese. In the past, their language was under the Boro-Garo languages but the circulation of the language is no more present. At present their mother tongue is Assamese.

Marriage 
Marriage in the Thengal kachari community involves Vedic rites and rituals. There are basically three types of marriage 1. Bor biya, 2. Abioi Biya or Juron Diya Biya, and 3. Poluai ana Biya.

Festivals and customs

Festivals 

 Suwa utuwa utsav
 Panitula Sabah
 Durga Puja
 Bihu

Customs associated with folk belief 

 Ai Sabah
 Apeswari Sabah
 Mritakok diya
 Shiva worship

Customs associated with worship of spirits 

 Jakh-Jakhini puja
 Ga Dangoria puja
 Bhitar Sokam
 Sani gharar sawul
 Jal Debota puja
 Lakhimi sal
 Tupula Bandha
 Pir diya

Religion 
The Thengals are mostly the followers of Vaishnavism and they were initiated by Basudev Gosain of Auniati satra. Hence they are the followers of Brahma Samhati and obeys the Vedic rites and rituals and are known as Bamonia as they engage Brahmin priests in their religious ceremonies or Mahekia as they conduct funeral feast after a month. Besides, there are two more sections of Thengals, one of which is called Nam-kirtania or Hari-dhanis and follows Eksarana Naam Dharma and are under Srimanta Sankardeva Sangha and the other section have taken the Ek Saran Bhagabati Dharma and initiated into the mode of worshiping of Mahapurushiya Dharma also called Egharoh Diniya as they conduct funeral feast after 11 days.

The Thengals are completely Hinduised. However, the Bamunia section are seen to have retained some of their animistic rituals.

See also 

 Sonowal kacharis
 Sonowal khel

Notes

References

 

Social groups of Assam
Tribes of Assam
Ethnic groups in Northeast India
Ethnic groups in South Asia